Noah Gerald Willis (January 6, 1940 – February 13, 2015) was an American businessman (lumber and cattle) and Democratic politician in Alabama.

From Calhoun County, Alabama, He served as a Calhoun County commissioner prior to his election to the State Legislature. Willis served in the Alabama House of Representatives from 1978 to 1982 and from 1986 to 1990. In 1984, he ran a quixotic campaign for President of the United States in the Democratic Primary in New Hampshire receiving only 50 votes. His home was a replica of Andrew Jackson's Hermitage, who was his political hero.

Notes

1940 births
2015 deaths
People from Calhoun County, Alabama
Businesspeople from Alabama
County commissioners in Alabama
Democratic Party members of the Alabama House of Representatives
20th-century American businesspeople